Dukla Banská Bystrica is a Continental cycling team founded in 2004. It is based in Slovakia and it participates in UCI Continental Circuits races. Peter Sagan and Peter Velits were also part of the team.

Team roster

Major wins

2004
Overall Tour d'Egypte, Maroš Kováč
Prologue (ITT), Stages 2, 3 & 6, Maroš Kováč
2005
Stage 1 Tour d'Egypte, Maroš Kováč
Stage 6 Tour d'Egypte, Ján Šipeky
Stage 1 GP de Gemenc, Maroš Kováč
Stage 3 Tour de Slovaquie, Maroš Kováč
2006
 Road Race Championships, Maroš Kováč
Stage 2 Tour de Serbie, Maroš Kováč
Coupe des Carpathes, Roman Broniš
Overall Tour du Maroc, Ján Šipeky
Stage 5, Maroš Kováč
Stage 7, Roman Broniš
2007
Prologue (ITT) & Stage 4 Tour d'Egypte, Maroš Kováč
GP Sharm el-Sheikh, Ján Šipeky
Stage 2 Presidential Cycling Tour of Turkey, Maroš Kováč
Stage 4a Tour de Slovaquie, Maroš Kováč
2008
Stage 3 Umm Al Quwain Race, Maroš Kováč
Stage 4 Umm Al Quwain Race, Roman Broniš
Stages 2, 3, 4 & 7 Tour of Libya, Roman Broniš
Stage 5 Tour of Libya, Ján Šipeky
2009
 Road Race Championships, Matej Vysna
GP Kooperativa, Peter Sagan
GP Boka, Peter Sagan
Stage 2 GP Bradlo, Patrik Tybor
Stages 2 & 5 Dookoła Mazowsza, Peter Sagan
2010
Stage 4 Vuelta al Uruguay, Matej Jurčo
Stage 2 The Paths of King Nikola, Maroš Kováč
2011
Challenge Khouribga, Maroš Kováč
Stage 1 Dookoła Mazowsza, Matej Jurčo
2012
Stage 3 Czech Cycling Tour, Maroš Kováč
Tour Bohemia, Maroš Kováč
2013
Košice–Miskolc, Michael Kolář
Banja Luka–Belgrad I, Michael Kolář
Stage 2 Carpathia Couriers Path, Michael Kolář
Stage 3 Tour de Serbie, Michael Kolář
 Under-23 Time Trial Championships, Erik Baška
Prologue (ITT) Sibiu Cycling Tour, Maroš Kováč
Stage 4 Baltic Chain Tour, Patrik Tybor
2014
GP Polski Via Odra, Erik Baška
Stage 3 Okolo Slovenska, Maroš Kováč
 Under-23 Time Trial Championships, Mario Daško
Central European Tour Košice–Miskolc, Erik Baška
Central European Tour Budapest GP, Erik Baška
2015
Stage 4 Okolo Slovenska, Maroš Kováč
Stage 1 Tour de Hongrie, Maroš Kováč
Stages 1 & 3 Tour of Bulgaria, Patrik Tybor
2016
Stage 6 Tour du Cameroun, Patrik Tybor
Stage 7 Tour du Cameroun, Martin Mahďar
Stage 5 Tour du Maroc, Patrik Tybor
Novi Sad Mountainbike, Martin Haring
Stages 7 & 9 Merida Cup, Juraj Bellan
Banská Bystrica, Martin Mahďar
Kláštor pod Znievom, Patrik Tybor
Rajecké Teplice Criterium, Maroš Kováč
 Cyclo-cross Championships, Martin Haring
2017
 Mountainbike (Marathon) Championships, Martin Haring
 Mountainbike (XC) Championships, Martin Haring
 Hill Climb Championships, Martin Haring
Stage 1 Grand Prix Chantal Biya, Ján Andrej Cully
2018
Stage 4 Tour du Cameroun, Martin Haring
 Time Trial Championships, Marek Čanecký
2019
 Time Trial Championships, Ján Andrej Cully
Stage 2 In the Steps of Romans, Ján Andrej Cully
Stage 4 Tour de Serbie, Ján Andrej Cully
2020
 Time Trial Championships, Ján Andrej Cully
Stage 2 In the Steps of Romans, Martin Vlčák
 Overall Tour de Serbie, Martin Haring

National Champions

2006
 Slovakian Road Race, Maroš Kováč

2009
 Slovakian Road Race, Matej Vysna

2013
 Slovakian U23 Time Trial, Erik Baška

2014
 Slovakian U23 Time Trial, Mario Daško

2016
 Slovakian Cyclo-cross, Martin Haring

2017
 Slovakian Mountainbike (Marathon), Martin Haring
 Slovakian Mountainbike (XC), Martin Haring
 Slovakian Hill Climb, Martin Haring

2018
 Slovakian Time Trial, Marek Čanecký

2019
 Slovakian Time Trial, Ján Andrej Cully

2020
 Slovakian Time Trial, Ján Andrej Cully

References

External links

UCI Continental Teams (Europe)
Cycling teams established in 2004
Cycling teams based in Slovakia
2004 establishments in Slovakia